Imani Cezanne is an American activist and spoken word poet. She is the founding president of President of S.P.E.A.K. (Spoken Poetry Expressed by All Kinds).

Biography 
Cezanne was born and raised in San Diego, California.

Cezanne has been on multiple National Poetry Slam teams including: Da Poetry Lounge, San Diego Slam Team, Oakland Slam Team Elevated!, Golden State Slam, The Root Slam, Berkeley Poetry Slam, and Busboys and Poets Beltway 

She represented the Root Slam at the 2018 National Poetry Slam.

"Heels" 
"Heels" was originally filmed by All Def Poetry during her performance of the piece at the Da Poetry Lounge. Later, Cezanne performed the piece again at the Ill List Slam Poetry Invitational in December 2014.

"Protest" 
Cezanne performed "Protest" at the 2015 National Poetry Slam.

"Angry Black Woman" 
Cezanne performed "Angry Black Woman" at the Da Poetry Lounge in 2015.

"Hunger Games" 
Originally performed at the 2014 Women of the World Poetry Slam in Austin, Texas. It was filmed by Button Poetry and uploaded to YouTube.

"#flyingwhileblack" 
Filmed at Women of the World Poetry Slam Finals 2016 in Brooklyn, NY, an event hosted by Poetry Slam, Inc.

Awards 
 2014 Individual World Poetry Slam ranked 9th
 2016 Women of the World Poetry Slam 2016 Co-champions with Emi Mahmoud

References 

American women poets
Slam poets
21st-century American poets
21st-century American women writers
Year of birth missing (living people)
Living people
People from San Diego